FCACA is a motorsport brand from China.

FCACA World Rally Team

About FCACA World Rally Team

Belonging to brand FCACA, FCACA World Rally Team was set up in Feb 2008 with the intention of promoting Chinese motorsports and competing in motorsport events at an international level.

Team FCACA is the only Shanghai team to have competed in Group N in the China Rally Championship (CRC). Although a brand new force in the CRC, Team FCACA showed the potential and determination to reach the top level of China motorsports. In just the second year in CRC competition, FCACA became the runner-up in the team's championship of season 2009 (only one point behind the champion team).

In 2010, with Finnish Champion Jari Ketomaa and Chinese Champion Rui Wang, Team FCACA steps forward to the international stage to compete in the SWRC and PWRC.

2010 Calendar

2010 Events History

2009 Events History

2008 Events History

China Rally Championship Career
Debut: 2008 Rally Shanghai
Latest Rally: 2009 Rally Shaowu
Season 2009 Team Standing: 2nd in Group N
Season 2008 Team Standing: 4th in Group N
Best Result: 2009 Rally Shaowu, Team Champion and Driver's Champion

Production World Rally Championship Career
Debut: 2008 Rally New Zealand
Latest Rally: 2009 Rally Australia
Best Result: 2009 Rally Australia, 23rd overall WRC

Other Events
2007 Sponsor UK driver Matthew Marsh to compete in 24 Hours of Le Mans
Racing Car: Ferrari F430 GT
Technical Support: Ferrari

2008 Sponsor Chinese driver Luo Ding to compete in Transsyberia
Racing Car: Porsche Cayenne S Transsyberia
Technical Support: Porsche

References

External links
 Official Website of FCACA World Rally Team

World Rally Championship teams
Chinese auto racing teams
Auto racing teams established in 2008